State Electricity Regulatory Commission (SERC) was a government agency responsible for the administration and regulation of the electricity and power industry in the People's Republic of China. This includes regulating the development of electricity markets, advising the National Development Reform Commission on the setting tariffs, while NDRC actually sets the tariffs, transmission, distribution, safety standards, technical standards, business licenses, environmental laws and development of the industry. Its functions were later folded into the National Energy Administration.

List of chairs
Chai Songyue (March 2003 - December 2006)
You Quan (December 2006 - April 2008)
Wang Xudong (April 2008 - June 2011)
Wu Xinxiong (June 2011 - March 2013)

See also
 Electric power industry in China
 Chinese electric motor industry
 North China Electric Power University
 North China University of Water Conservancy and Electric Power
 State Grid Corporation of China
 China Power International Development
 China Power Investment Corporation
 China Yangtze Power
 China Resources Power
 China Southern Power Grid
 China Township Electrification Program
 China Village Electrification Program
 Energy in China
 Renewable energy in China
 Electric power in China
 Coal power in China
 Nuclear power in China
 Wind power in China
 Solar power in China
 Oil in China
 Geothermal power in China
 Bioenergy in China

References

External links
State Electricity Regulatory Commission Official Website

Government agencies of China
State Council of the People's Republic of China
2003 establishments in China
Government agencies established in 2003
Organizations based in Beijing
Electricity authorities